Larkfield-Wikiup is a census-designated place unincorporated area in Sonoma County, California, United States. The population was 8,884 at the 2010 census, up from 7,479 at the 2000 census. It comprises the Mark West area between Santa Rosa (to the south), Windsor (north), Calistoga (east), and Fulton (west). There are at least four schools within the limits of the CDP, including Cardinal Newman High School, John B. Riebli Elementary School, Mark West Elementary, and San Miguel Elementary schools.

Geography

Nevertheless, the Mark West Creek's seasonal flows pass directly through this region.

As of 2005, the landscape is made up of housing developments, interspersed with vineyards, farms, and light industry.

Demographics

2010
The 2010 United States Census reported that Larkfield-Wikiup had a population of 8,884. The racial makeup of Larkfield-Wikiup was 7,042 (79.3%) White, 81 (0.9%) African American, 168 (1.9%) Native American, 292 (3.3%) Asian, 19 (0.2%) Pacific Islander, 878 (9.9%) from other races, and 404 (4.5%) from two or more races. Hispanic or Latino of any race were 1,979 persons (22.3%).

The Census reported that 8,841 people (99.5% of the population) lived in households, 37 (0.4%) lived in non-institutionalized group quarters, and 6 (0.1%) were institutionalized.

There were 3,434 households, out of which 1,179 (34.3%) had children under the age of 18 living in them, 1,729 (50.3%) were opposite-sex married couples living together, 425 (12.4%) had a female householder with no husband present, 204 (5.9%) had a male householder with no wife present. There were 234 (6.8%) unmarried opposite-sex partnerships, and 34 (1.0%) same-sex married couples or partnerships. 811 households (23.6%) were made up of individuals, and 325 (9.5%) had someone living alone who was 65 years of age or older. The average household size was 2.57. There were 2,358 families (68.7% of all households); the average family size was 3.03.

The population was spread out, with 2,150 people (24.2%) under the age of 18, 678 people (7.6%) aged 18 to 24, 2,051 people (23.1%) aged 25 to 44, 2,736 people (30.8%) aged 45 to 64, and 1,269 people (14.3%) who were 65 years of age or older. The median age was 41.0 years. For every 100 females, there were 97.2 males. For every 100 females age 18 and over, there were 94.4 males.

The homeowner vacancy rate was 1.1%; the rental vacancy rate was 6.5%. 5,787 people (65.1% of the population) lived in owner-occupied housing units and 3,054 people (34.4%) lived in rental housing units.

2000
As of the census of 2000, there were 7,479 people, 2,735 households, and 2,023 families residing in the CDP. The racial makeup of the CDP was 87.10% White, 1.03% African American, 1.11% Native American, 3.38% Asian, 0.12% Pacific Islander, 3.29% from other races, and 3.97% from two or more races. Hispanic or Latino of any race were 10.67% of the population.

There were 2,735 households, out of which 39.9% had children under the age of 18 living with them, 57.4% were married couples living together, 12.5% had a female householder with no husband present, and 26.0% were non-families. 19.5% of all households were made up of individuals, and 6.1% had someone living alone who was 65 years of age or older. The average household size was 2.71 and the average family size was 3.11.

In the CDP, the population was spread out, with 28.2% under the age of 18, 7.2% from 18 to 24, 28.7% from 25 to 44, 25.0% from 45 to 64, and 10.9% who were 65 years of age or older. The median age was 38 years. For every 100 females, there were 95.0 males. For every 100 females age 18 and over, there were 92.1 males.

The median income for a household in the CDP was $62,202, and the median income for a family was $66,504. Males had a median income of $55,153 versus $35,954 for females. The per capita income for the CDP was $27,062. About 6.0% of families and 6.5% of the population were below the poverty line, including 9.9% of those under age 18 and 4.5% of those age 65 or over.

Politics
In the state legislature, Larkfield-Wikiup is in the 3rd Senate District, and in the 1st Assembly District.

Wildfires

Tubbs Fire 
In October 2017, the Tubbs Fire destroyed approximately 500 homes in the Larkfield-Wikiup area. The fire blew in through the Mark West Springs area, ultimately destroying 5,000+ buildings in Sonoma and Napa counties.

Kincade Fire 
The Kincade Fire started on October 23, 2019, in The Geysers. The fire ultimately prompted evacuations in much of Sonoma County, and Larkfield was one of the communities evacuated. The fire pushed up to the border of the community during an extreme wind event and blew into parts of the Tubbs Fire burn scar which devastated the community just two years before.

See also
 William Marcus West

References

Census-designated places in Sonoma County, California
Census-designated places in California